Polyrhaphis papulosa is a species of beetle in the family Cerambycidae. It was described by Olivier in 1795. It is known from Colombia, Peru, Brazil, and French Guiana.

References

Polyrhaphidini
Beetles described in 1795